James Macdonald (17 September 1906 – 8 March 1969) was an Irish cricketer.  MacDonald was a left-handed batsman who bowled slow left-arm orthodox.  He was born at Comber, United Kingdom (today Northern Ireland).

Macdonald made his first-class debut for Ireland against Wales at Ormeau, Belfast in 1926.  He made thirteen further first-class appearances for Ireland, the last of which came against Scotland in 1939.  In his fourteen first-class matches, he scored 622 runs at an average of 23.92, with a high score of 108 not out.  This score, which was his only first-class century, came against the Marylebone Cricket Club in 1936.  An all-rounder, MacDonald took 35 wickets at a bowling average of 25.45, with best figures of 5/33.  These figures, which were his only first-class five wicket haul, came against Scotland in 1933.

He died at Bangor, Northern Ireland on 8 March 1969.  He was survived by his brother Thomas, who also played first-class cricket for Ireland. James had two other brothers George and Norman. Norman was born in 1914,saw active service in the Pacific at a Commander in the Royal Navy and died in 2014.

References

External links
James MacDonald at ESPNcricinfo
James MacDonald at CricketArchive

1906 births
1969 deaths
People from Comber
Irish cricketers
Cricketers from Northern Ireland